Grant County Courthouse, also known as the Old Grant County Courthouse, is a historic county courthouse located at Petersburg, serving Grant County, West Virginia. The original section was built in 1878–79 and expanded in 1909.  It is composed of 3 two-story brick rectangles consisting of a large center section with lower and narrower wings. The building is styled with Neo-Colonial design features. The center section features a two-story projecting portico with pediment and supported by four Corinthian order fluted columns.

It was listed on the National Register of Historic Places in 1979.

References

Courthouses on the National Register of Historic Places in West Virginia
Colonial Revival architecture in West Virginia
Government buildings completed in 1879
Buildings and structures in Grant County, West Virginia
National Register of Historic Places in Grant County, West Virginia
Neoclassical architecture in West Virginia
1879 establishments in West Virginia